Andover is a town in Oxford County, Maine, United States. The population was 752 at the 2020 census. Set among mountains and crossed by the Appalachian Trail, Andover is home to the  Lovejoy Covered Bridge and was the site of the Andover Earth Station (now demolished).

History

The land which became known as Andover was originally purchased in 1788 by a group of proprietors mostly from Andover, Massachusetts. The original proprietors were Thomas Poor of Methuen, Massachusetts; Jonathan Abbot, Benjamin Poor, Ebenezer Adams, Ingalls Bragg, Theodore Stevens, Samuel Farnum, Philip Abbott, Samuel Johnson, Abiel Lovejoy, and Eben Poor, Jr. all of Andover, Massachusetts; Joseph Frye of Fryeburg, Maine; and John York, Ezekiel Merrill, and Josiah Bean of Bethel, Maine. The town was first settled in 1789 by Ezekiel Merrill and his family who were transported there from Bethel, Maine, in canoes managed by members of the local Pequawket tribe. The first saw-mill was built on the East Branch of the Ellis River by Col. Thomas Poor in 1791 and was used to provide the lumber for the still standing Merrill-Poor House.

The town was incorporated on June 23, 1804, as East Andover, and then renamed Andover in 1820 when Maine separated from Massachusetts.

Early occupations included agriculture and lumbering. As the town developed, factories made doors, sash, blinds, starch, cheese, boots and shoes, edge-tools, carriages and harness. It also had a tannery. Located on an intervale surrounded by mountains, Andover was noted for "its grand and beautiful scenery," with streams abounding in trout. After the Civil War, the town became a popular destination for sportsmen, especially fishermen attracted by the nearby Richardson Lakes. A hotel was built to accommodate the influx of tourists.

In 1960, Andover was selected to be site of the Andover Earth Station, completed in 1962. It was the location of the first live transatlantic television signal broadcast by satellite Telstar 1.

Geography

Crossed by the Appalachian Trail, Andover is drained by the Ellis River, a tributary of the Androscoggin River. The river is home to many fish and wildlife from which avid hunters and fisherman would try their luck.

The town is crossed by state routes 5 and 120. It borders the towns of Roxbury and Byron to the east, Rumford to the south, Newry to the south and west, Andover West Surplus to the west, and Andover North Surplus to the north.

Climate

This climatic region is typified by large seasonal temperature differences, with warm to hot (and often humid) summers and cold (sometimes severely cold) winters.  According to the Köppen Climate Classification system, Andover has a humid continental climate, abbreviated "Dfb" on climate maps.

Demographics

2010 census

As of the census of 2010, there were 821 people, 385 households, and 253 families living in the town. The racial makeup of the town was 98.8% White, 0.4% Native American, 0.4% Asian, and 0.5% from two or more races.

There were 385 households, of which 20.5% had children under the age of 18 living with them, 52.5% were married couples living together, 7.8% had a female householder with no husband present, 5.5% had a male householder with no wife present, and 34.3% were non-families. 28.3% of all households were made up of individuals, and 12.7% had someone living alone who was 65 years of age or older. The average household size was 2.13 and the average family size was 2.57.

The median age in the town was 51.1 years. 15.6% of residents were under the age of 18; 4.7% were between the ages of 18 and 24; 20.5% were from 25 to 44; 35.3% were from 45 to 64; and 23.9% were 65 years of age or older. The gender makeup of the town was 50.7% male and 49.3% female.

2000 census

As of the census of 2000, there were 864 people, 359 households, and 257 families living in the town.  The population density was 15.1 people per square mile (5.8/km2).  There were 553 housing units at an average density of 9.6 per square mile (3.7/km2).  The racial makeup of the town was 98.96% White, 0.46% African American, 0.12% Native American, 0.12% from other races, and 0.35% from two or more races. Hispanic or Latino of any race were 0.35% of the population.

There were 359 households, out of which 27.6% had children under the age of 18 living with them, 61.8% were married couples living together, 5.8% had a female householder with no husband present, and 28.4% were non-families. 23.4% of all households were made up of individuals, and 9.2% had someone living alone who was 65 years of age or older.  The average household size was 2.41 and the average family size was 2.81.

In the town, the population was spread out, with 23.3% under the age of 18, 3.5% from 18 to 24, 28.0% from 25 to 44, 30.7% from 45 to 64, and 14.6% who were 65 years of age or older.  The median age was 42 years. For every 100 females, there were 99.5 males.  For every 100 females age 18 and over, there were 100.3 males.

The median income for a household in the town was $36,058, and the median income for a family was $40,855. Males had a median income of $32,031 versus $20,000 for females. The per capita income for the town was $20,253.  About 9.0% of families and 12.2% of the population were below the poverty line, including 18.3% of those under age 18 and 13.3% of those age 65 or over.

Sites of interest

 Lovejoy Bridge
 Andover Hook and Ladder Company Building, built in 1904, listed on the National Register of Historic Places in 2001
 Andover Public Library, founded in 1899, listed on the National Register in 1981
 Merrill-Poor House, listed on the National Register in 1976
 Andover Earth Station, former site of a 7-story horn antenna used to communicate with the Telstar 1 satellite during the 1960s

Notable people

 Charlie Akers, Olympic biathlete
 Molly Ockett, Abenaki healer
 Henry Varnum Poor, financial analyst
 John A. Poor, lawyer, editor and entrepreneur

References

External links

 Town of Andover, Maine
 Andover Public Library
 River Valley Chamber of Commerce
 Maine.gov – Andover, Maine

Towns in Oxford County, Maine
Towns in Maine

The Web-Archived link for the AndoverMaine.Com website is at: https://web.archive.org/web/20190124004320/http://www.andovermaine.com/ 

The original online main page isn't currently loading, but subpages can be found by browser searching for andovermaine.com online. The Web / Internet Archive site contains the complete website at least up until it was last updated and archiver-crawled in early 2019.